Daniel Gachulinec (born February 16, 1994) is a Slovak professional ice hockey defenceman currently playing for HC Slovan Bratislava of the Slovak Extraliga.

Gachlinec previously played for HC '05 Banská Bystrica, HK 36 Skalica, ŠHK 37 Piešťany and MsHK Žilina. He played in the 2014 World Junior Ice Hockey Championships for Slovakia.

Career statistics

International

Awards and honors

References

External links

 

1994 births
HC 07 Detva players
HC Slovan Bratislava players
HC '05 Banská Bystrica players
HK 36 Skalica players
MsHK Žilina players
ŠHK 37 Piešťany players
Living people
Sportspeople from Považská Bystrica
Slovak ice hockey defencemen